Goleen GAA is a Gaelic Athletic Association based in the parish of Goleen, in Cork, Ireland. The club plays Gaelic football only, and participates in competitions organised by Cork county board and Carbery divisional board. Traditionally, the club has operated at Junior B level, the second lowest level possible in Cork. In 2016, the club won the Cork Junior C Football Championship. The club uses the name Dunmanus Rovers for juvenile teams as in 2018 they joined neighbouring club Muintir Bhaire to try to field teams. The club's colours are black and amber.

Achievements
 Cork Junior C Football Championship (1): 2016
 Cork Junior B Football Championship (0): (runner-up 2019, 2021)
 West Cork Junior B Football League (2): 1993, 2010
 West Cork Junior B Football Championship (3): 1959, 2011, 2019
 West Cork Under-21 C Football Championship (1): 1999

Gaelic football clubs in County Cork
Gaelic games clubs in County Cork